María de los Remedios Barranco García (born 11 June 1961) better known as María Barranco is a Spanish actress, who has won two Goya Awards for Best Supporting Actress.

Biography 
María de los Remedios Barranco García was born on 11 June 1961 in Málaga.  She studied medicine, but quit to study drama in her city, where she participated in various theatre groups. Later, she moved to Madrid, to debut on stage in a production of La venganza de Don Mendo (Don Mendo's revenge). Barranco made her film debut in 1986's El elegido (The Chosen).

She was married to filmmaker Imanol Uribe from 1982 to 2004. They have a daughter, Andrea.

Filmography

Television 

Sopa boba
Ellas son así

Goya Award
Barranco won the Goya Award for playing a transsexual prostitute in the 1990 film The Ages of Lulu.

Other awards included the Miami Hispanic Film Festival Award for Best Actress (for Bwana), the Premios ACE Award for Best Supporting Actress (for Women on the Verge of a Nervous Breakdown) and the Sant Jordi Award for Best Spanish Actress (also for 'Women on the Verge of a Nervous Breakdown''.

References

External links

1961 births
Living people
People from Fuengirola
Spanish film actresses
Best Supporting Actress Goya Award winners
20th-century Spanish actresses
21st-century Spanish actresses
Spanish television actresses